Karim bin Bujang is a Malaysian politician from WARISAN. He was the Member of Sabah State Legislative Assembly for Bongawan from 1990 to 2013.

Politics 
He was a member of USNO before it merged with BERJAYA to form UMNO Sabah in 1991. He had held the post of Secretary-general of Barisan Nasional Sabah. In 2018, he joined WARISAN and contested for the Kimanis federal seat and 2020 Kimanis by-election.

Election result

Honours 
  :
  Officer of the Order of the Defender of the Realm (KMN) (1995) 
  :
  Commander of the Order of Kinabalu (PGDK) - Datuk (1995)

References 

Malaysian politicians
20th-century Malaysian politicians
21st-century Malaysian politicians
Malaysian Muslims
People from Sabah
United Sabah National Organisation politicians
Former United Malays National Organisation politicians
Sabah Heritage Party politicians
Members of the Sabah State Legislative Assembly
Malaysian people of Malay descent
Living people
1953 births
Commanders of the Order of Kinabalu
Officers of the Order of the Defender of the Realm